The campaign to suppress bandits in southwestern China was a counterinsurgency campaign waged by the forces of the Chinese Communist Party against the Chinese Nationalist guerrillas, mostly consisting of bandits and regular nationalist forces not withdrawn from mainland China during the transfer of the nationalist government to Taiwan.  The campaign occurred after the conclusion of World War II during the Chinese Civil War in Southwest China. The Communist counterinsurgency campaign was ultimately successful.

Strategies
The Nationalists forces found themselves in a precarious dilemma while conducting this campaign against the Communist forces stemming from complex politico-military situation in the region. Consequently, several actions proved to be grave miscalculations, contributing to their eventual defeat.

Nationalist miscalculations
Like other futile Nationalist attempts to wage guerrilla and insurgency warfare against the Communist forces after evacuation of the Nationalist government to Taipei, the first Nationalist strategic miscalculation made was at least an equal if not larger factor than the enemy's political and military pressure in the Nationalist defeat in this campaign. Immediately after World War II, the Nationalists had neither sufficient forces nor adequate logistical capabilities to secure the Japanese-occupied regions of China; the Nationalist government, unwilling to allow these regions to fall into Communist control, ordered the Japanese and their Chinese puppet government not to surrender to the Communists and allowed them to retain their fighting capabilities to 'maintain order' in occupied regions which entailed  resisting Communist forces. This decision incurred resentment from the populace in Japanese occupied territory. This further eroded local support of the Nationalist government which was already blamed for the allowing the successful Japanese invasion in the first place. Half a decade later as the National Revolutionary Army was driven from mainland China, the Nationalists made another miscalculation in their desperation by enlisting the support of local bandits in the fight the Communists and ordered those Nationalist forces remaining in mainland China to join the bandits in combat against the communism. This decision proved unwise as the bandits were deeply feared and hated by the local populace which they preyed upon, and the sight of Nationalist forces joining the bandits further diminished the support for the Nationalist forces and solidified support for the People's Republic of China.

Another strategic miscalculation made by the Nationalists was similar to the one the nationalist government had made immediately after World War II, when it attempted to simultaneously address the warlord problem that had plagued China alongside its efforts to combat the growing Communist threat together. The warlords who were allied with Chiang Kai-shek's nationalist government were only interested in retaining their power and defected to the Japanese side when Japanese invaders offered to let them keep their power in exchange for their collaborations.  After the World War II, the forces of the Japanese puppet government realigned with the Nationalist faction, once more with the intention of retain their power as they had when collaborating with the Japanese. It was difficult for Chiang to effectively dispose of these warlords immediately upon their surrender to the Nationalists as such an action would have caused discontent among other Nationalist factions. Furthermore, the former Japanese–aligned warlords could aid the Nationalist cause by retaining control of their territory and combating Communist insurgents. This would have the added benefit of weakening both the Communists and the collaborators.  Half a decade later, these bandits the Nationalist government had failed to exterminate were deemed undesirable candidates for evacuation to Taiwan, consequently their use as a force to combat the Communists appeared to be a logical alternative.  If the bandits were able to undermine the Communist governance of mainland China, the Nationalist forces would have an advantage in their anticipated counterattack to retake China. On the other hand, if the bandits were subdued by the Communists then the Nationalists would have been spared the task of eradicating the bandit forces after retaking China. However the bandit forces were more interested in keeping their own power than suppressing the Chinese Communist Revolution, and thus did not devote any substantial effort to fighting the Communists.  Furthermore, the eventual eradication of bandits by the Communist government only served to strengthen its popular support as the Communists had succeeded where previous governments as far back from Qing Dynasty had failed.

Yet another strategic error by the Nationalist government involved the Nationalist forces left behind in mainland China. The Nationalist government required high quality and disciplined forces to defend Taiwan, the last Nationalist sanctuary.  The forces which mainly comprised the forces of the Nationalist warlord allies were not the most suited to effect the last stand defense the Nationalist were preparing, and as such these forces were not given a high priority for evacuation. Instead, these forces were to remain on the mainland and continue to fight the Communists with guerrilla tactics. However this decision angered many of the troops left behind, and it was unlikely that they would fight the Communists with the same vigor as Nationalist forces with political motivation. Compounding this problem, due to the need of bandits' knowledge of the local area, leaders among the bandits were often granted higher ranks than the Nationalist troops left behind.  As a result, the Nationalist regulars–turned–guerrillas often were unwilling to work in conjunction to the bandits they were once tasked to exterminate, especially as many of these forces had earlier engaged each other in combat during pacification campaigns. Similarly, the bandits were similarly willing to cooperate and attempted to expend those Nationalist troops when possible in order to spare their comrades.

The retreating Nationalist government made another significant error which was financial in nature. Due to the lack of money, those bandits turned guerrillas were mostly provided with arms, but not sufficient supplies and money.  The bandits turned guerrilla had no problem of looting the local population to get what they need, as they had done for decades, which inevitably drove the general popular support further into the communist side.  The little financial support provided by the nationalist government was simply not enough to support such guerrilla and insurgency warfare on such a large scale.  Another unexpected but disastrous result of the insufficient financial support was that it had greatly eroded the support of the nationalist government within its own ranks.  The wealthy landowners and businessmen were the strong supporters of nationalist government and as their properties were confiscated by the communists and redistributed to the poor, their hatred toward the communist government was enough to cause many of them to stay behind voluntarily to fight behind the enemy line.  However, the landowners and businessmen were also longtime victims of bandits due to their wealth, and many of them had suffered even more than the general populace who had far less wealth.  As these former landowners and businessmen turned guerrilla fighters were ordered to join their former bandits who once threatened, looted, kidnapped and even killed them and their relatives, it was obvious that such cooperation was mostly in name only and could not produce any actual benefits, and the alienation and discontent toward the nationalist government harbored by these once ardent nationalists would only grow greater.

Another problem for the nationalists was the strong disagreement among themselves over how to fight the war against their communist enemy.   Military professionals preferred to fight a total war, incapacitate the enemy's ability to fight, but this inevitably conflicted with the interest of another faction of strong supporters of the nationalist government: the landowners and businessmen, who joined bandits to oppose such tactic.  The reason was that landowners and businessmen supporting and joining the nationalist guerrilla firmly believed that the nationalists would be able to retake mainland China within several years and they would be able to regain their lost lands, businesses, and other properties that were confiscated and redistributed to the poor by the communists.  As the nationalist military professionals in the guerrilla suggested and destroyed the production facilities and businesses as part of the total war, the landowners and businessmen would not be able to regain any valuable properties after the return of the nationalist government because those properties had been destroyed.  The bandits agreed with the businessmen and landowners to oppose the idea of total war for a different reason: when the properties were destroyed and productivity dropped, they would not be able to loot enough supply to survive.  As a result, despite the animosities between the bandits and landowners and businessmen, they were united together in the opposition to the military professional faction of the nationalists.

Communist strategies
In contrast to the nationalists, the Communists had much simpler and more effective strategy aided by their lack of the same order of problems as the Nationalists: the Communist forces simply needed to eradicate bandits. The Communist forces exploited Nationalist error to their advantage. As with all other bandit eradication campaigns, the Communist strategy sought to mobilize the victim populations to against the bandits. Furthermore, the Communists were in position to custom tailor specific strategies to combat bandits in specific localities.

Campaign
Southwestern China had been long plagued by bandits that had continuously existed for centuries.  By the time the Nationalist government had lost control in the region in the face of the advancing Communist army, there were over half a million bandits active in the region.  In Sichuan alone, there were over three hundred bands of bandits.  In Yunnan, there were a hundred forty–eight bands of bandits.  In Guizhou, there were five hundred forty–one bands of bandits. In addition large numbers of bandits were also active in Xikang.  The number of bandits soon would more than double to more than a million, encouraged by the Nationalist government, which previously had attempted to eradicate them.  After the Chengdu campaign concluded in December 1949, many retreating Nationalist military units joined forces with local bandits to continue their struggle against the Communists, but the alliance was a fragile one, and still allowed the Communists to defeat them separately.

In February 1950, the Communists made it a top priority to eradicate the bandits. The Communists decided to first eradicate bandits in wealthy areas and regions adjacent to the communication/transportation lines, gradually expanding their efforts into more remote regions. The Communist 3rd Corps, IV Corps, V Corps, XVIII Corps and the 7th Army of the I Corps, totaling to seventeen armies, were deployed for the bandit suppression campaign. From March 1953 onward, the Communists first targeted large bands of bandits with each military formation responsible of pacification of its designated area.  Due to the heavy bandit activity in Sichuan, the planned deployment of Communist troops in Tibet was postponed to eradicate bandits first.  The 11th Army and the 12th Army, totaling six divisions of the Communist III Corps, were responsible for eradicating bandits in eastern Sichuan.  Eight divisions from the 10th Army, 18th Army and 15th Army of the Communist southern Sichuan Military Region were tasked to eradicating bandits in southern Sichuan. Seven divisions of the 60th Army, 62nd Army, and 7th Army of the Western Sichuan Military Region were tasked to eradicate bandits in western Sichuan.  The 61st Army was tasked to eradicate bandits in northern Sichuan, and the 62nd Army was tasked to eradicate bandits in Xikang.  The 13th Army, 14th Army and units of the 15th Army of the Communist IV Corps were tasked to eradicate bandits in Yunnan.  The 16th Army of III Corps was tasked to eradicate bandits in Guizhou.  After ten months of fighting, large organized bands of bandits were wiped out by the end of 1950, with over nine hundred thousand bandits annihilated.

From 1951 onward, the People's Liberation Army switched their focus to bandits who went into hiding in the remote regions while they continued strengthening the security of warehouses, transportation infrastructure, and communication lines. Large numbers of Communist cadres were sent to strengthen the local garrison and security forces.  The main targeted area included the border regions of provinces and border region of counties, remote mountain ranges, and the area near Yunnan – Burmese border. From February 1951 to March 1951, the Western Sichuan Military Region successfully eradicated bandits active in Maogong (懋功), and secured the region by stepping up political pressure and mobilizing the local population.  The success was approved by Mao Zedong and became an example for the rest to follow.  Additionally to better coordinate bandit suppression efforts between different provinces and counties, bandit suppression operations headquarters for joint command were established at the border regions between provinces and counties.  In 1951, over two hundred seven thousand bandits were annihilated in Sichuan, Xikang, Yunnan and Guizhou.  Towns that had been occupied by bandits for more than a year were successfully taken back, including Ceheng (册亨), Wango (望谟), Libo (荔波) and Luodian County.  Meanwhile, fourteen Communist regiments were deployed to annihilate bandits fled from southwestern China to northwestern China.

By the end of 1953, all bandits in southwestern China has been successfully eradicated, with a total of more than one million and a hundred sixty thousands bandits annihilated, over seven hundred artillery pieces and over six hundred thousands rifles captured.  The internal conflicts between the bandits and the former Nationalist regulars contributed greatly to the Communist victory, and some female nationalists totaling over thirty thousands had suffered grave personal tragedies in the campaign:  refusing to surrender to the Communists after that nationalist governments collapsed in the unstoppable Communist advance, many Nationalists opted to continue their fight by joining bandits in the hope of forming a united front to wage the guerrilla war against the war, as the retreating Nationalist government had directed. However many bandits took the opportunity to settle old scores with the Nationalist government they once fought. Over thirty thousand female Nationalists who attempted to join bandits were treated as enemies. These female nationalists were brutally raped and tortured by the bandits, afterward, they were sold to minorities in the remote regions as sex slaves. It was not until 1956 that the last of these unfortunate women were finally rescued from slavery and finally returned home.

Outcome
Although they shared a common anticommunist goal, the Nationalist guerrilla warfare campaign was largely handicapped by the enlistment of bandits, many of whom had fought Nationalist troops in the earlier pacification campaigns, and looted, kidnapped and even killed landlords and business owners, an important faction that supported the Nationalist government. But their union against their common enemy was half-hearted at the best. Compounding the problem further were additional differences within the ranks of the Nationalist guerrillas themselves. The futile Nationalist guerrilla campaign failed in the face of the expanding Communist state.

See also
List of battles of the Chinese Civil War
National Revolutionary Army
History of the People's Liberation Army
Chinese Civil War

References

Zhu, Zongzhen and Wang, Chaoguang, Liberation War History, 1st Edition, Social Scientific Literary Publishing House in Beijing, 2000,  (set)
Zhang, Ping, History of the Liberation War, 1st Edition, Chinese Youth Publishing House in Beijing, 1987,  (pbk.)
Jie, Lifu, Records of the Liberation War: The Decisive Battle of Two Kinds of Fates, 1st Edition, Hebei People's Publishing House in Shijiazhuang, 1990,  (set)
Literary and Historical Research Committee of the Anhui Committee of the Chinese People's Political Consultative Conference, Liberation War, 1st Edition, Anhui People's Publishing House in Hefei, 1987, 
Li, Zuomin, Heroic Division and Iron Horse: Records of the Liberation War, 1st Edition, Chinese Communist Party History Publishing House in Beijing, 2004, 
Wang, Xingsheng, and Zhang, Jingshan, Chinese Liberation War, 1st Edition, People's Liberation Army Literature and Art Publishing House in Beijing, 2001,  (set)
Huang, Youlan, History of the Chinese People's Liberation War, 1st Edition, Archives Publishing House in Beijing, 1992, 
Liu Wusheng, From Yan'an to Beijing: A Collection of Military Records and Research Publications of Important Campaigns in the Liberation War, 1st Edition, Central Literary Publishing House in Beijing, 1993, 
Tang, Yilu and Bi, Jianzhong, History of Chinese People's Liberation Army in Chinese Liberation War, 1st Edition, Military Scientific Publishing House in Beijing, 1993 – 1997,  (Volume 1), 7800219615 (Volume 2), 7800219631 (Volume 3), 7801370937 (Volume 4), and 7801370953 (Volume 5)

Battles of the Chinese Civil War
1950s in China
Campaigns to Suppress Bandits